Zlatozar Boev (born 20 October 1955) is a Bulgarian ornithologist, paleontologist, and zoologist. He has published 345 papers and other material, in Bulgarian, English, French, and Russian. He has classified 36 taxa. Boev is a part of the National Museum of Natural History, the Bulgarian Society for the Protection of Birds, and the Bulgarian Ornithological Society.

References

1955 births
Bulgarian ornithologists
Living people